Teodosie is a Romanian name meaning "Theodosius", and may refer to:

Teodosie of Wallachia, Prince of Wallachia (1521-1522)
Teodosie Bârcă (1894-?), politician from Bessarabia
Teodosie Petrescu (b. 1955), Archbishop of Tomis since 2001

Romanian masculine given names